The John E. Olcott House is a historic house at 35–37 Central Street in Waltham, Massachusetts.  Built c. 1837, the two story house is a rare local example of Federal style executed in brick.  The house was built and occupied by John Olcott, a bricklayer, and is essentially vernacular in its styling, lacking some of the flourishes found in the more elaborate Elijah Fiske House.  It is five bays wide, with a shallow-pitch hip roof, twin chimneys, and a projecting enclosed entry vestibule.

The house was listed on the National Register of Historic Places in 1989.

See also
National Register of Historic Places listings in Waltham, Massachusetts

References

Houses on the National Register of Historic Places in Waltham, Massachusetts
Federal architecture in Massachusetts
Houses completed in 1837
Houses in Waltham, Massachusetts